Parliamentary elections were held in Norway in 1888. Although the Liberal Party received the most votes, the result was a victory for the Conservative Party, which won 51 of the 114 seats in the Storting. The Conservatives formed a government led by  Emil Stang.

Results

References

General elections in Norway
19th-century elections in Norway
Norway
Parliamentary